The 2021–22 ABA League Second Division was the 5th season of the ABA Second Division with 14 teams from Bosnia and Herzegovina, Croatia, Montenegro, North Macedonia, Serbia, and Slovenia participating in it.

Teams 
A total of 14 teams contest the league for the 2021–22 season, based on the results in the domestic championships and taking into consideration the results in the previous season. On 31 August 2021, ABA League JTD announced 12 teams and availability for two teams to be filled by awarding wild cards. On 13 September, two clubs Široki and Zlatibor were awarded with wildcards fulfilling the remaining spots.

Distribution
The following is the access list for this season.

Team allocation 

The labels in the parentheses show how each team qualified for the place of its starting round:
 1–4: Positions in national leagues at the end of regular season.
 C: National League champion
 WC: Wild card

In July 2021, a Croatian team Adria Oil Škrljevo withdrew its bid to join the Alpe Adria Cup for the 2021–22 season. Also, another Croatian team Sonik-Puntamika withdrew its bid.

A Croatian team Gorica has been applied for the Alpe Adria Cup in the upcoming season, also. Following withdrew of Gorica, Vrijednosnice Osijek joined the league for the upcoming season.

Personnel and sponsorship

Coaching changes

Venues
The Regular season is divided in five tournaments. The hosts are Zlatibor in Serbia, Osijek in Croatia, and Banja Luka, Sarajevo, and Široki Brijeg in Bosnia and Herzegovina.

Schedule 
The schedule of the competition will be as follows.

Originally scheduled for 17–23 January 2022, the Banja Luka Tournament was rescheduled to 6–12 February due to COVID-19 outbreaks.

Regular season
The Regular season is split in five tournaments featuring two or three rounds.

League table

Results

Playoffs

Based on the results and position of the clubs in the standings after the regular season, Playoffs will take place with teams from 1st to 8th position. The Quarterfinals will be played in knockout pairs 1–8, 2–7, 3–6, 4–5. The winners of the Quarterfinals will qualify to the Semifinals and the winners of the Semifinals will play the Final.

Bracket

See also 
 2021–22 ABA League First Division

 2021–22 domestic competitions
  2021–22 Basketball Championship of Bosnia and Herzegovina
  2021–22 HT Premijer liga
  2021–22 Prva A liga
  2021–22 Macedonian First League
  2021–22 Basketball League of Serbia
  2021–22 Slovenian Basketball League

References

External links 
 Official website
 ABA League at Eurobasket.com

ABA Second Division seasons
Adriatic
2021–22 in European basketball leagues
2021–22 in Bosnia and Herzegovina basketball
2021–22 in Croatian basketball
2021–22 in Montenegrin basketball
2021–22 in Serbian basketball
2021–22 in Slovenian basketball
2021–22 in North Macedonia basketball